Afterglow is an atmospheric phenomenon.

Afterglow may also refer to:

Science and medicine 
An emission after an excitation; see phosphorescence
Afterglow (gamma ray burst), fainter, fading, longer wavelength emission after a gamma ray burst
Afterglow plasma, concept in plasma physics
Afterglow (drug culture), concept in drug culture

Film, television, and radio 
Afterglow (1997 film), starring Nick Nolte and Julie Christie
Afterglow (1923 film), a 1923 British silent drama film
"Afterglow", the seventeenth episode of the second season of That 70s Show
Afterglow: A Last Conversation with Pauline Kael, a 2003 book about film critic Pauline Kael
Afterglow, a jazz radio show produced by WFIU

Music
 Afterglow (band), an American psychedelic band in the late 1960s
 The Afterglow, a pop/rock band from Turin, Italy

Albums and EPs
 Afterglow (Electric Light Orchestra album), 1990
 Afterglow (Crowded House album), 1999
 Afterglow (Quench album), 2003
 Afterglow (Sarah McLachlan album), 2003
 Afterglow (Black Country Communion album), 2012
 Afterglow (Marcellus Hall & The Hostages album), 2013
 Afterglow (Soulfire Revolution album), 2015
 After Glow (Carmen McRae album), 1957
 The Afterglow, a 2014 EP by Blackbear

Songs
"Afterglow" (Tina Turner song), 1987
"Afterglow" (Taxiride song), 2003
"Afterglow" (INXS song), 2006
"Afterglow" (Wilkinson song), 2013
"Afterglow" (Chvrches song), 2015
"Afterglow of Your Love", 1969
"Afterglow (Ed Sheeran song)", 2020
"Afterglow", by Genesis from Wind & Wuthering, 1976
"Afterglow", by John Frusciante and Josh Klinghoffer from A Sphere in the Heart of Silence, 2004
"Afterglow", by José González from Vestiges & Claws, 2015
"Afterglow", by The Mission from Sum and Substance, 1994
"Afterglow", by The Servants from Disinterest, 1990
"Afterglow", by Taylor Swift from Lover, 2019
"Afterglow", by Travis from The Invisible Band, 2001
"Afterglow", by Vertical Horizon from Burning the Days, 2009
"Afterglow", by Tkay Maidza from Tkay, 2016
"The Afterglow", by Silverstein from Dead Reflection, 2017

Other uses
Afterglow Vista, a mausoleum in Roche Harbor, Washington, United States